An election recount is a repeat tabulation of votes cast in an election that is used to determine the correctness of an initial count. Recounts will often take place if the initial vote tally during an election is extremely close. Election recounts will often result in changes in contest tallies. Errors can be found or introduced from human factors, such as transcription errors, or machine errors, such as misreads of paper ballots.

Australia 
Australian elections use instant-runoff voting and single transferable vote at the federal level to determine representatives for the House of Representatives and the Senate respectively. Tabulating votes for both houses involves automatic recounts known as "fresh scrutiny." For the House, this process occurs the Monday after a general election. The process in the Senate occurs shortly after the election, but only first preferences are recounted. A voter's full preferences for the Senate are not counted until after fresh scrutiny occurs. Candidates for either house may also request recounts, though such a request may be refused by the Electoral Commission.

Similar processes occur at the state and territorial level. As in federal elections, candidates may request recounts subject to the discretion of electoral authorities.

Canada 
Recounts in Canadian elections are known as "judicial recounts" because a superior court judge oversees them. In federal elections, tied elections or races with a difference of 0.1% result in automatic recounts. Electors (including candidates) may also petition for recounts within four days of the final vote count under certain conditions. Each province and territory has its own regulations regarding provincial or territorial elections.

Ireland 
In Irish presidential elections, recounts occur only at the approval of the High Court. Candidates or the Director of Public Prosecutions may petition for a recount within seven days of the election. In the event of a recount, the High Court's decision is final. An identical process is available for elections to the Oireachtas.

New Zealand 
New Zealand uses a mixed-member proportional representation system for elections to its Parliament. As in Australia, an official count takes place shortly after the election day involving a recount of all of the ballots in electorates. Judicial recounts are also available in electorate and party list races. No threshold is needed for a recount to occur.

United States
In the United States recounts rarely reverse election results. Of the 4,687 statewide general elections held from 2000 to 2015, 27 were followed by a recount, and only three resulted in a change of outcome from the original count: 2004 Washington gubernatorial election, 2006 Vermont Auditor of Accounts election, and 2008 United States Senate election in Minnesota. Recounts are conducted at the state level rather than the federal level, even for federal offices.

Recount methods

Machine recount
A machine recount is a retabulation of ballots cast during the election. This can be done using an optical scan voting system, punched card system or direct-recording electronic (DRE) voting machine. With document-based Ballot Voting Systems, ballots are counted a second time by some form of machine. With Non-document-based Ballot Voting Systems officials will recollect vote data from each voting machine which will be combined by a central tabulation system.

Manual recount
A manual or "hand" recount involves each individual physical representation of voter intent being reviewed for voter intent by one or more individuals.

With DRE voting machines, a voter-verified paper audit trail (VVPAT) is examined from each voter. For some DREs that do not generate a VVPAT, images can be printed for each ballot cast and counted individually.

Legal requirements
Recounts can be mandatory or optional. In some jurisdictions, recounts are mandatory in the event the difference between the top two candidates is less than a percentage of votes cast or of a fixed number. Mandatory recounts are paid for by the elections official, or the state. Mandatory recounts can usually be waived by the apparent losing candidate. The winning side will usually encourage the loser to waive the recount in a show of unity and to avoid spending taxpayer money.

Each jurisdiction has different criteria for optional recounts. Some areas permit recounts for any office or measure, while others require that the margin of victory be less than a certain percentage before a recount is allowed. In all instances, optional recounts are paid for by the candidate, their political party, or, in some instances, by any interested voter. The person paying for the recount has the option to stop the recount at any time. If the recount reverses the election, the jurisdiction will then pay for the recount.

Source:

Notable recounts
Florida election recount - 2000 U.S. presidential election
Washington gubernatorial election, 2004
Vermont Auditor of Accounts election, 2006
United States House of Representatives elections in Florida, 2006#District 13 - Florida's 13th congressional district
United States Senate election in Minnesota, 2008
Virginia Attorney General election, 2013
2016 United States presidential election recounts
2018 United States Senate election in Florida
2020 United States presidential election in Georgia

United Kingdom
More than one recount is allowed if a candidate or their agent requests one and the returning officer deems it appropriate.
It is possible for a defeated candidate denied a recount by the Returning Officer, to request one from the court by means of an election petition. There are several cases where a Parliamentary election has been the subject of a court-ordered recount.

See also
Risk-limiting audit
Electoral fraud

External links
NCSL list of recount rules
Citizens for Election Integrity Recount Laws Database
The count: Fresh scrutiny - YouTube video from the Australian Electoral Commission

References

Elections
Vote counting